The Arab Maghreb Union (AMU) or simply the Maghreb Union (MU) is a political union and economic union trade agreement aiming for economic and future political unity among Arab countries States that are located primarily in the Maghreb in North Africa. Its members are the nations of Algeria, Libya, Mauritania, Morocco and Tunisia. The Union has been unable to achieve tangible progress on its goals due to deep economic and political disagreements between Morocco and Algeria regarding, among others, the issue of Western Sahara. No high level meetings have taken place since 3 July 2008, and commentators regard the Union as largely dormant.

Creation
The idea for an economic union of the Maghreb began with the independence of Tunisia and Morocco in 1956. It was not until thirty years later, though, that five Maghreb states—Algeria, Libya, Mauritania, Morocco, and Tunisia—met for the first Maghreb summit in 1988. The Union was established on 17 February 1989 when the treaty was signed by the member states in Marrakech. According to the Constitutive Act, its aim is to guarantee cooperation "with similar regional institutions... [to] take part in the enrichment of the international dialogue... [to] reinforce the independence of the member states and... [to] safeguard... their assets." Strategic relevance of the region is based on the fact that, collectively, it boasts large phosphate, oil, and gas reserves, and it is a transit centre to southern Europe. The success of the Union would, therefore be economically important.

Organization
There is a rotating chairmanship within the AMU which is held in turn by each nation. The current Secretary-General is the Tunisian Taïeb Baccouche.

Members
During the 16th session of the AMU Foreign Ministers, held on 12 November 1994 in Algiers, Egypt applied to join the AMU grouping.

Economy 
The economy of the AMU combines the economies of four out of five member states. All countries are predominantly Arab and Muslim states. The four out of five AMU countries have a combined GDP (at purchasing power parity; PPP) of US$1.5276 trillion. The richest country on the basis of GDP per capita at PPP is Algeria. On the basis of per capita GDP (nominal), Libya is the richest country, with incomes exceeding US$65.803 per capita.

Operations 
There have been problems of traditional rivalries within the AMU. For example, in 1994, Algeria decided to transfer the presidency of the AMU to Libya. This followed the diplomatic tensions between Algeria and other members, especially Morocco and Libya, whose leaders continuously refused to attend AMU meetings held in Algiers. Algerian officials justified the decision, arguing that they were simply complying with the AMU Constitutive Act, which stipulates that the presidency should in fact rotate on an annual basis. Algeria agreed to take over the presidency from Tunisia in 1994, but could not transfer it due to the absence of all required conditions to relinquish the presidency as stipulated by the Constitutive Act.

Following the announcement of the decision to transfer the presidency of the Union, the Libyan leader, Muammar Gaddafi, stated that it was time to put the Union "in the freezer". This raised questions about Libya's position towards the Union. The concern was that Libya would have a negative influence on the manner in which it would preside over the organization.

Moreover, traditional rivalries between Morocco and Algeria, and the unsolved question of Western Sahara's sovereignty, have blocked union meetings since the early 1990s despite several attempts to re-launch the political process. Western Sahara, a former Spanish colony south of Morocco that was "reintegrated" by the kingdom of Morocco, has declared independence as the Sahrawi Arab Democratic Republic. The latest top-level conference, in mid-2005, was derailed by Morocco's refusal to meet, due to Algeria's vocal support for Sahrawi independence. Algeria has continuously supported the Polisario Front liberation movement.

Several attempts have been made, notably by the United Nations, to resolve the Western Sahara issue. In mid-2003, the UN Secretary General's Personal Envoy, James Baker, proposed a settlement plan, also referred to as the Baker Plan II. The UN's proposal was rejected by Morocco and accepted by the Sahrawi Arab Democratic Republic. As far as bilateral attempts are concerned, very little has been achieved, as Morocco continues to refuse any concessions that would allow the independence of Western Sahara, while Algeria maintains its support for the self-determination of the Sahrawis.

In addition, the quarrel between Gaddafi's Libya and Mauritania has not made the task of reinvigorating the organisation any easier. Mauritania has accused the Libyan secret service of being involved in a 2003 attempted coup against President Maaouya Ould Sid'Ahmed Taya. Libya has denied the accusation.

See also 

 Maghrebis
 African Economic Community (AEC)
 Arab League
 Common Market for Eastern and Southern Africa (COMESA)
 Economic Community of West African States (ECOWAS)
 Euro-Mediterranean free trade area (EU-MEFTA)
 Greater Arab Free Trade Area (GAFTA)
 List of trade blocs
 US - Middle East Free Trade Area (US-MEFTA)
 Union for the Mediterranean (UfM)

References

External links

 
 Maghreb Arab Online

Arab organizations
Pan-Arabist organizations
Maghreb
Trade blocs
Regional Economic Communities of the African Union
Organizations established in 1988
Intergovernmental organizations established by treaty
1989 establishments in Africa
Organizations based in Rabat
International organizations based in Morocco